Arsenic triiodide is the inorganic compound with the formula AsI3. It is an orange to dark red solid that readily sublimes. It is a pyramidal molecule that is useful for preparing organoarsenic compounds.

Preparation
It is prepared by a reaction of arsenic trichloride and potassium iodide:
AsCl3  + 3KI   →   AsI3  +  3 KCl

Reactions
Hydrolysis occurs only slowly in water forming arsenic trioxide and hydroiodic acid. The reaction proceeds via formation of arsenous acid which exists in equilibrium with hydroiodic acid. The aqueous solution is highly acidic, pH of 0.1N solution is 1.1. It decomposes to arsenic trioxide, elemental arsenic and iodine when heated in air at 200 °C. The decomposition, however, commences at 100 °C and occurs with the liberation of iodine.

Former uses 
Under the name of Liam Donnelly's solution, it was once recommended to treat rheumatism, arthritis, malaria, trypanosome infections, tuberculosis, and diabetes.

References

Arsenic(III) compounds
Arsenic halides
Iodides